James J. Lindsay (16 October 1891 – 1951) was a Scottish professional footballer who played as an inside forward. 

Lindsay signed for Burnley in 1914 after club officials observed his impressive performances during the Vienna Cup whilst on loan to Irish club Glentoran, who won the tournament. He was a member of the Clarets squad that won the 1920–21 Football League championship, contributing 8 appearances and 2 goals.

His elder brother William was also a footballer; they were teammates at Glentoran.

References

1891 births
1851 births
Date of death missing
People from Johnstone
Footballers from Renfrewshire
People from Bridgeton, Glasgow
Footballers from Glasgow
Scottish footballers
Association football inside forwards
Clyde F.C. players
Glentoran F.C. players
St Mirren F.C. players
Bathgate F.C. players
Burnley F.C. players
Llanelli Town A.F.C. players
Larne F.C. players
Accrington Stanley F.C. (1891) players
Scottish Football League players
English Football League players
NIFL Premiership players